Afarin (also Romanized as Āfarīn; also known as Qeshlāq-e Āfarīn) is a village in Sharifabad Rural District, Sharifabad District, Pakdasht County, Tehran Province, Iran. At the 2006 census, its population was 705, in 170 families.

References 

Populated places in Pakdasht County